Ardani may refer to several places in Greece:

Ardani, Evros, a village in the municipal unit of Feres, Evros regional unit
Ardani, Trikala, a village in the municipal unit of Paliokastro, Trikala regional unit